Karaçay can refer to:

 Karaçay, Honaz
 Karaçay, Osmancık
 Karaçay, Sungurlu